Arctoa is a genus of mosses belonging to the family Dicranaceae.

The species of this genus are found in Europe and America.

Species:
 Arctoa anderssonii Wichura, 1859 
 Arctoa fulvella Bruch & W.P.Schimper, 1846

References

Dicranales
Moss genera